Kaare Melhuus (11 May 1915 – 27 October 1996) was a Norwegian politician for the Conservative Party.

He was born in Melhus as a son of farmers. After finishing his secondary education in Trondheim he graduated with the siv.øk. degree from the Norwegian School of Economics. He worked in mercantile education, as an accountant and consultant, and finished his career as headmaster of Hamar Handelsgymnasium from 1975 to 1985.

Melhuus was a member of Hamar city council from 1947 to 1951, and again from 1963 to 1979. He was a deputy member of Hedmark county council from 1963 to 1975. He served as a deputy representative to the Parliament of Norway from Hedmark during the terms 1954–1957 and 1958–1961. In total he met during 122 days of parliamentary session. Melhuus also chaired Hamar Conservative Party (1947–48, 1952–54) and was deputy chair of Hedmark Conservative Party (1952–53).

Melhuus also sat on a number of boards in business and organizations. He was among others a board member of Hamar Handelsgymnasium from 1951 to 1964 and a supervisory council member of Hamar Stiftstidende from 1955 to 1970, Hamar, Vang og Furnes Kommunale Kraftselskap from 1968 to 1984, and Sparebanken Hedmark from 1968 to 1977. He was awarded the King's Medal of Merit in gold in 1985.

References

1915 births
1996 deaths
People from Melhus
Politicians from Hamar
Norwegian School of Economics alumni
Heads of schools in Norway
Deputy members of the Storting
Conservative Party (Norway) politicians
Recipients of the King's Medal of Merit in gold